The Cuba national badminton team represents Cuba in international badminton team competitions. The Cuban team is controlled by the Cuba Badminton Federation (Spanish: Federación Cubana de Bádminton), the governing body for badminton in Cuba. The Cuban men's team competed in the 2010 Pan Am Badminton Championships.

The Cuban mixed team debuted in the 2019 Pan Am Badminton Championships mixed team event. The team reached the semifinals but lost out to Canada. The team finished in fourth place after losing the bronze medal tie to Brazil. Cuba also competes in the Pan American Games and has won a silver and a bronze in badminton.

Participation in Pan American Badminton Championships

Men's team

Mixed team

Current squad 

Men
Osleni Guerrero
Angel Herrera Rodríguez
Bryan Veliz Arbolay
Ernesto Reyes
Lazaro Yovani Madera Padrino
Leodannis Martínez
Leyder Jesus Laurencio Batista
Wandy Luis Román González

Women
Tahimara Oropeza
Adaivis García
Adriana Artiz Ataury
Barbara Ines la Rosa Torres
Melissa Pérez
Thalía Mengana Marrero
Yuvisleydis Ramirez Chapman
Yeily Mari Ortiz Rodriguez

References 

Badminton
National badminton teams
Badminton in Cuba